Annie Lapin (born 1978) is an American artist who lives and works in Los Angeles, California. Her abstract paintings are grounded in representation.

Early life and education 

Although born in Washington D.C., Lapin spent most of her early years in Kentucky. She received her BA from Yale University in 2001, and completed an MFA at the University of California, Los Angeles, in 2007.

Exhibitions 

Lapin has had solo exhibitions at Grand Arts in Kansas City, Missouri (2008), at the Pasadena Museum of California Art (2009), at the Museum of Contemporary Art Santa Barbara (2012), and at the Weatherspoon Art Museum of the University of North Carolina at Greensboro, where was Falk Visiting Artist in 2013–2014.

Notes

Further reading 
 Los Angeles Times Review: Annie Lapin's Various Peep Shows
 Priscilla Frank (January 25, 2014). Annie Lapin's Newest Painting Exhibition Combines Instant Attraction and a Slow Burn. Huffington Post.

External links
 Video: New American Paintings x Future Shipwreck: Annie Lapin

1978 births
American artists
Living people